The enzyme anhydrosialidase catalyzes the following process:

Elimination of α-sialyl groups in N-acetylneuraminic acid glycosides, releasing 2,7-anhydro-α-N-acetylneuraminate

This enzyme belongs to the family of lyases, specifically those carbon-oxygen lyases acting on polysaccharides.  The systematic name of this enzyme class is glycoconjugate sialyl-lyase (2,7-cyclizing). Other names in common use include anhydroneuraminidase, sialglycoconjugate N-acylneuraminylhydrolase (2,7-cyclizing), and sialidase L.

References

 

EC 4.2.2
Enzymes of unknown structure